The Rozas House is a historic house located at 31 Polk St. in San Juan Bautista, California, United States. The house, which was built in 1856, is long and narrow and consists of a series of rooms opening to the outside and an interior courtyard, an unusual style for wood-frame houses. Ambrozio Rozas, Sr., purchased the house soon after its construction; his son, Ambrozio Rozas, Jr., and his family occupied the house. Rozas, Jr., lived in San Juan Bautista for the rest of his life; after his death, his wife Emelda Lugo Rozas occupied the house until 1950.

The Rozas House was added to the National Register of Historic Places in 1982.

References

External links

Houses on the National Register of Historic Places in California
Houses completed in 1856
Houses in San Benito County, California
San Juan Bautista, California
National Register of Historic Places in San Benito County, California